Maurice Lefèbvre (30 October 1913 – 24 May 1983) was a French male water polo player. He was a member of the France men's national water polo team. He competed with the team at the 1936 Summer Olympics and 1948 Summer Olympics.

References

External links
 

1913 births
1983 deaths
French male water polo players
Water polo players at the 1936 Summer Olympics
Water polo players at the 1948 Summer Olympics
Olympic water polo players of France
Sportspeople from Tourcoing
20th-century French people